The 1981 Soviet First League was the eleventh season of the Soviet First League and the 41st season of the Soviet second tier league competition.

Final standings

Top scorers

Number of teams by union republic

External links
 1981 season. RSSSF

1981
2
Soviet
Soviet